Kemys is a surname. Notable people with the surname include:

Lawrence Kemys (died 1618), a seaman and companion of Sir Walter Raleigh
Edward Kemys (c. 1693 – 1736), Member of the Parliament of Great Britain

Notable people with the forename Kemys include:

John Kemys Spencer-Churchill (1835 – 1913),

See also
Kemeys